The Brick Inn, also known as the Canton Hotel, in Canton, Kentucky, was built in 1819.  It was listed on the National Register of Historic Places in 1980.

It is a two-story five-bay brick building, with south and west facades laid in Flemish bond.

It is located on Lake Barkley, formerly part of the Cumberland River.

It was built by early settler Abraham Boyd.  The hotel hosted visitors including the Marquis de Lafayette, James K. Polk, and Jenny Lind.

References

Hotel buildings on the National Register of Historic Places in Kentucky
National Register of Historic Places in Trigg County, Kentucky
Hotel buildings completed in 1819
1819 establishments in Kentucky